The Nave Espacial de Varginha (local , Varginha's spacecraft) is a 20 metres tall water tower with a disc-shaped water reservoir in Varginha, Brazil, which was built in 2001. Nave Espacial de Varginha is reminiscent of the Varginha incident, an alleged UFO landing, which took place on January 20, 1996.

See also
 List of towers
 Varginha UFO incident

External links
 tourism data
 info

Towers completed in 2001
Towers in Brazil
Water towers
Round towers